Tony Harmon is a classical guitarist who has performed on numerous television shows and special events.  He composed and performed the musical soundtrack for ABC television's The William Randolf Hearst Story, and was asked to play at the Western White House for Ronald Reagan.

Biography
Harmon was born in Riverside, California to Sheila and Jim Harmon. He was introduced to the guitar at an early age by his father and began studying the instrument at the age of eleven at the local YMCA.

By the time Tony was 13 years old, he was becoming an accomplished guitarist and he would devote 6 to 8 hours every day to his practice. He was known to take his guitar everywhere he went...even on family holiday.

At 14 Tony was asked to perform at Loma Linda University by the music faculty and gave his first public performance there to an audience of over 2500.

Tony studied guitar with Patrick Read, Miguel Rubio, Philip Rosheger, George Sakellariou, Ray Reussner, Frederick Noad and Christopher Parkening

At 18 years old Tony traveled to England to further his studies of the guitar and upon his return to the United States, Tony was asked to compose the soundtrack to ABC television's 'The William Randolf Hearst Story'.

Earlier that year Tony was awarded the Outstanding Instrumentalist award by the Northern California Arts Association.

Tony would later go on to perform in concerts around the country and even performed for President Ronald Reagan and his wife Nancy.

Tony Harmon was asked to perform at the 2007 La Guitarra California Festival along with Pepe Romero and Roland Dyens and other great guitarists of our time. Tony also opened for The Romeros at the 2015 La Guitarra California Festival

Guitarist Tony Harmon resides in Pine Mountain Club on the Central Coast of California and now devotes his time and talents to fund-raising by performing benefit concerts for worthy causes. Tony is also the founder of GetSoundTrax, an online source for uploading, licensing, playlists and downloading all genres of music. Since 2004, Tony has performed an annual benefit "Evening of Guitar" concert for the Historic Missions of California and the Pacific Conservatory of the Performing Arts. Tony also holds a 5th rank in martial art Jeet Kune Do and is an expert in Eskrima, the national sport and martial art of the Philippines

Tony Harmon is getting ready for a new release soon.

Discography

References

External links
 Tony Harmon home page

Living people
Year of birth missing (living people)
American classical guitarists
American male guitarists
American acoustic guitarists
Musicians from Riverside, California
Guitarists from California
Classical musicians from California